Vakhrusheve, is a city in Krasnyi Luch Municipality, Luhansk Oblast (region) of Ukraine. Population: , .

Since 2014, Vakhrusheve has been controlled by the Luhansk People's Republic and not by Ukrainian authorities. In 2016, it was renamed by the Verkhovna Rada to Bokovo-Khrustalne according to the law prohibiting the names of Communist origin. The name is not being used locally.

Demographics 
Native language as of the Ukrainian Census of 2001:
Russian  82.6%
Ukrainian  13.2%
Belarusian  0.1%
Moldavian  0.1%

References 

Cities in Luhansk Oblast
Populated places established in the Ukrainian Soviet Socialist Republic
Cities of district significance in Ukraine
City name changes in Ukraine
Former Soviet toponymy in Ukraine